Saint Thomas the Apostle is a 1608–1614 painting of Thomas the Apostle by El Greco, now in the Museo del Prado. 

It originally formed part of a series of works produced by the artist for the parish church in Almadrones, Spain, a series which represented a set of variants on a set of paintings of the apostles (or Apostolate) for Toledo Cathedral. The painting is key to Gregorio Marañón's theory that the painter used  mental patients at the Hospital del Nuncio as models.

Bibliography (in Spanish)
 ÁLVAREZ LOPERA, José, El Greco, Madrid, Arlanza, 2005, Biblioteca «Descubrir el Arte», (colección «Grandes maestros»). .
 SCHOLZ-HÄNSEL, Michael, El Greco, Colonia, Taschen, 2003. .
 https://web.archive.org/web/20120204020907/http://www.artehistoria.jcyl.es/genios/cuadros/6420.htm

References

Paintings by El Greco in the Museo del Prado
Thomas
1600s paintings
1610s paintings